Tag Entertainment (sometimes titled TAG Entertainment) was largely founded by Steve Austin and John T. Botti (formerly CEO of Authentidate) and became a publicly held film production company formerly headquartered in Santa Monica, California.  The company was described as a centered producer of family films.

Productions

 Deal (2008) ...  Production Company
 Miracle Dogs Too (2006) (V) ... Production Company
 Red Riding Hood (2006) .... Production Company
 Popstar (2005) .... Production Company
 Supercross (2005) .... Production Company
 Motocross Kids (2004) ... Production Company
 Miracle Dogs (2003) (TV) ... Production Company
 Hansel & Gretel (2002) .... Production
 The Santa Trap (2002) (TV) ... Production Company
 The Retrievers (2001) (TV) .... Production Company
 No Place Like Home (2001) .... Production Company
 Castle Rock (2001) ... Production Company
 Route 66 ... Production Company

References
Tag Entertainment Corp. filing information at SECinfo.com site. http://www.secinfo.com/dsvrn.z1Qs.htm
TAG Entertainment USA action by an Administrative Proceeding Before The Securities Commissioner Of Maryland. http://www.oag.state.md.us/Securities/Actions/2007/TAG%20FinalCD_10_07.pdf
 John T. Botti, Director

Film production companies of the United States